Biên Hòa (Northern accent: ,) is the capital city of Đồng Nai Province, Vietnam and part of the Ho Chi Minh City metropolitan area and located to the east of Ho Chi Minh City, to which Biên Hòa is linked by Vietnam Highway 1. Classified as a class-1 provincial city, it is the sixth largest city in Vietnam by population.

Geography

Topography
Biên Hòa spans 264 square kilometers of midland terrain in the west of Đồng Nai province. Most of the city lies east of the Đồng Nai River.

Biên Hòa shares borders with:
Trảng Bom district to the east
Bình Dương Province to the west
Long Thành district and Ho Chi Minh City to the south
Vĩnh Cửu district to the North

Administrative divisions 
Biên Hòa has 30 divisions (29 wards and 1 commune), include:

Demographics
In 1989 the estimated population was 273,879. In 1999, the population was 435,400, and in 2009 it was 701,194. In December 2012, the population of the city crossed the one million mark.

The population in 2019 was 1,055,414, and in 2021 it was 1,119,190.

History

Nguyễn dynasty
The capture of Biên Hòa on December 16, 1861, was an important allied victory in the Cochinchina Campaign (1858–62). This campaign, fought between the French and the Spanish on the one side and the Vietnamese (under the Nguyễn dynasty) on the other, began as a limited punitive expedition and ended as a French war of conquest. The war concluded with the establishment of the French colony of Cochinchina, a development that inaugurated nearly a century of French colonial dominance in Vietnam.

Republic of Vietnam
Biên Hòa grew into a major suburb of Saigon as the capital city of the Republic of (South) Vietnam grew. Following the First Indochina War, tens of thousands of refugees from the northern and central regions of Vietnam—a large portion of whom were Roman Catholics—resettled in Biên Hòa as part of Operation Passage to Freedom. During the Vietnam War, the United States Air Force operated Biên Hòa Air Base near the city. Mortar attacks on U.S. and ARVN targets were frequently staged from residential districts in Biên Hòa. Two of the better-known attacks took place during Tết of 1968 as well as 1969.

Socialist Republic
Like most other areas of Vietnam, post-war Biên Hòa suffered a period of severe economic decline between 1975 and the second half of the 1980s. In part, because of its high concentration of former refugees and their descendants who had fled the communist government of North Vietnam in the mid-1950s, Biên Hòa was the site of small-scale resistance to the communist government in the months immediately following the fall of the Republic of Vietnam.

In the 1980s, the government of the Socialist Republic of Vietnam initiated the economic reform policy of Đổi Mới and Biên Hòa experienced an economic resurgence. Biên Hòa and the surrounding areas received large amounts of foreign investment capital, and the area rapidly industrialized.

, Biên Hòa is now an industrial center of southern Vietnam, and many factories and warehouses (often funded in collaboration with Japanese, Singaporean, American, Swiss and other foreign investors) operate in the area surrounding the city. Biên Hòa Sugar is located near the city.

With regard to entertainment, the city includes several amusement parks, nightclubs and restaurants lining the Đồng Nai River. Construction has increased rapidly (with many Western-style houses and villas under development), and the real estate market has experienced a series of boom cycles since the mid-1990s.

Biên Hòa also is the location of the Biên Hòa Military Cemetery, a large national cemetery for fallen soldiers and military officials of the former Republic of Vietnam (ARVN). The cemetery today is now neglected by the current communist regime, and many sections of the cemetery are either vandalized, or demolished for the construction of various building projects. Most of the time there was no proper reburial for the skeletal remains, and this caused an outcry by overseas Vietnamese, most of whom came from the South. The Vietnamese America Foundation, and its program called "The Returning Casualty", are attempting to restore the cemetery and excavate a nearby mass grave.

At the end of 2015, the Prime Minister of Vietnam issued Decision No.2488/QD-TTg recognizing Biên Hòa as a class-1 provincial city.

Economy
Biên Hòa is one of the centers of industry in southern Vietnam. There are six industrial zones:
Biên Hòa I Industrial Zone, 335 ha. There is a plan to convert it into an urban, commercial, and service area by the end of 2025.
Biên Hòa II Industrial Zone, 365 ha
Amata Industrial Park, 674 ha. This is the first investment project of Amata Corporation in Vietnam.
Long Bình Industrial Zone Development
Agtex Long Bình Industrial Park - AGTEX 28, 43 ha
Tam Phước Industrial Park, 323 ha

Sanyang Motor's Vietnam Manufacturing & Export Processing Co., Ltd. (VMEP) is located in Biên Hòa.

Transport
National Route 1, National Route 51, and National Route 1K pass through the city.
Hồ Chí Minh Bridge leads out of the south of the city.
Biên Hòa station on the North–South Railway also leads out of the city.
Bien Hoa Air Base is one of the biggest air bases in Vietnam.
Đồng Nai port is located on Đồng Nai river.

Education
Dong Nai University
Lạc Hồng University
Lương Thế Vinh High School for the Gifted
Ngo Quyen High School

Environment

As a result of the Viet Nam war, some areas around Bien Hoa Air Base were dioxin pollution. The authorities are trying to clean up these areas.

Notable landmarks

Trấn Biên Literature Temple has been recognised as national historical relic. Ancient Citadel of Biên Hòa is the only ancient citadel in the Southern Vietnam that still exists today. Nguyễn Hữu Cảnh Temple worships Nguyễn Hữu Cảnh, the General had a huge contribution in the Nam tiến.
Đồng Nai Bridge
Cầu Ghenh Bridge (1901-1904) - designed by company associated with Gustave Eiffel; 2 spans destroyed 2016 and new bridge to be built after 2025
Rach Cat Bridge (Cầu Rạch Cát) (1903) - outer spans designed by company associated with Gustave Eiffel; inner span added during Vietnam War
Đồng Nai Stadium

Sister city
  Gimhae, Gyeongsangnam-do, South Korea
  Pakse, Champasak province, Laos

References

 
Provincial capitals in Vietnam
Districts of Đồng Nai province
Populated places in Đồng Nai province
Cities in Vietnam